Crisfield Historic District is a national historic district at Crisfield, Somerset County, Maryland, United States. It consists of a cohesive collection of houses, churches, and commercial buildings dating primarily from about 1870 to 1930.  They reflect the rapid growth of the town as the center of the booming Chesapeake Bay oyster industry during that period. The district encompasses much of Crisfield's main residential and commercial areas, locally known as "uptown."  The Crisfield Armory is located within the district boundaries.

It was added to the National Register of Historic Places in 1990.

References

External links
, including photo from 1986, at Maryland Historical Trust
Boundary Map of the Crisfield Historic District, Somerset County, at Maryland Historical Trust

Historic districts in Somerset County, Maryland
Crisfield, Maryland
Victorian architecture in Maryland
Queen Anne architecture in Maryland
Colonial Revival architecture in Maryland
Historic districts on the National Register of Historic Places in Maryland
National Register of Historic Places in Somerset County, Maryland